Bourassa may refer to:

People
 Ernie Bourassa, mayor of Whitehorse, Yukon
 François Bourassa (1813–1898), Quebec farmer and political figure
 François Bourassa (musician) (born 1959), Québécois jazz pianist
 Henri Bourassa (1868–1952), Québécois politician noted for his French Canadian nationalism
 Jocelyne Bourassa (1947–2021), Canadian golfer
 Joseph Boutin Bourassa (1853–1943), Quebec politician
 Louis Bourassa (born 1954), Canadian rower
 Lucien Bourassa (1884–1937), mayor of Shawnigan, Quebec
 Napoléon Bourassa (1827–1916), Canadian architect
 Robert Bourassa (1933–1996), politician and former Quebec Premier

Places
 Henri Bourassa Boulevard, Island of Montreal, Quebec, Canada
 Robert-Bourassa Boulevard, Ville-Marie, Montreal, Quebec, Canada

Electoral districts
 Bourassa (electoral district), federal electoral district in Quebec
 Bourassa (provincial electoral district), in Quebec
 Bourassa-Sauvé (provincial electoral district), in Quebec

Facilities and structures
 Robert-Bourassa generating station, La Grande 2, James Bay Project, Quebec, Canada
 Robert-Bourassa Reservoir, James Bay Project, Quebec, Canada
 Bourassa State Forest, Bedford County, Virginia, USA
 Henri-Bourassa station (subway), Montreal metro system, Montreal, Quebec, Canada
 Terminus Henri-Bourassa (bus), Montreal, Quebec, Canada
 Place Bourassa (shopping mall), Montreal North, Montreal, Quebec, Canada
 École Secondaire Henri-Bourassa (Bourassa High School), Montreal Nord, Montreal, Quebec, Canada

Other
 Bourassa (automobile), various one-off automobiles built by Henri-Emile Bourassa between 1899 and 1926.

See also